The Defence Space Command (DSpC) is an Australian Defence Force integrated tri-service headquarters in the Royal Australian Air Force (RAAF) tasked with conducting strategic space planning, as well as design, construction, maintenance and operation of space facilities. DSpC operates with personnel from the Royal Australian Navy, the Australian Army and the RAAF together with the Australian Public Service reporting to the Chief of Air Force. The inaugural Defence Space Commander is Air Vice-Marshal Catherine Roberts.

See also 
 Space command

References

External links 
 Defence Space Command

RAAF commands
Space units and formations
Military units and formations established in 2022
2022 establishments in Australia
Space programme of Australia